The Las Vegas All-American Classic (formerly the Paradise Bowl) was an annual post-season college football all-star game that was played in January from 2002 to 2006. After taking two years off due to lack of sponsorship, there were plans for the game to return in 2009 as the North–South All-American Classic, but it was postponed and has not been played since.

History
The game was known in 2002 and 2003 as the Paradise Bowl. It was conceived by Darry Alton, in view of the discontinuation of the Blue–Gray Football Classic and the Gridiron Classic, in order to provide players from lesser-known and lesser-televised schools, or players who were primarily backups, with a chance to impress NFL scouts. Alton would later help found the Magnolia Gridiron All-Star Classic.

The Paradise Bowl games were played in St. George, Utah, on the campus of the Dixie State College of Utah at Hansen Stadium. In 2002, the game matched players from schools located in Colorado and Utah (playing as the "Utah-Colorado All-Stars") against players from schools in other Western states (playing as the "West All-Stars"), and in 2003, the game matched players from Midwestern schools ("MidWest All-Stars") against players from Western schools ("West All-Stars").

Starting in 2004, the game was held at Sam Boyd Stadium in Las Vegas, Nevada. With the move, it was renamed the Las Vegas All-American Classic. These games matched a team of players from Division I-A and I-AA schools located east of the Mississippi River (who play as the "East" team) against players from schools located west of the Mississippi (who play as the "West" team). The intent each year was to field teams of about fifty players each, all of whom were NFL draft-eligible (in their junior years or later), with forty to forty-five players from Division I-A schools. Prior to the game, players participated in team practices and combines open to professional scouts. A reception honoring offensive and defensive most valuable players for each team followed the game. The game was televised regionally on Fox Sports Net networks.

The 2007 game was cancelled due to lack of sponsorship. NFL Network, which was scheduled to televise the contest, replaced it with a rebroadcast of Super Bowl XXXII. It was hoped that the game could be revived in 2008 with a new title sponsor, but that did not happen. There were then plans to relocate to Miami with a name change to the North–South All-American Classic and a game date of January 19, 2009, but it was postponed indefinitely.

Game results

Series records: West (3–2), Midwest (1–0), East (1–2), Utah-Colorado (0–1)

MVPs
 2002
West – Scott McEwan (QB, UCLA) and Derrick Lewis (WR, SDSU)
UTCO – Dennis Smith (TE, Utah)
 2003
Overall – Brian Jones (QB, Toledo)
Midwest – Arlen Harris (RB, Hofstra)
West – Michael Oliva (WR, Cal-Davis)
Special Teams – Andrew Amerson (WR/PR, Troy State)
 2004 – Jason Fife (QB, Oregon)
 2005
East – DeCori Birmingham (RB, Arkansas) and Eugune Childs (CB, Western Michigan)
West – Darnell Stephens (RB, Air Force) and Antoine Cash (LB, Southern Miss)
 2006 – Tra Boger (DB, Tulane)

See also
List of college bowl games

References

External links
 

College football all-star games
Sports competitions in Las Vegas
Sports in Utah
American football in Utah